Louis Joseph Guisto (January 16, 1895 – October 15, 1989) was a Major League Baseball first baseman who played for five seasons. He played for the Cleveland Indians from 1916 to 1917 and from 1921 to 1923.

He managed in the minors from 1929–1931.

The baseball field at Saint Mary's College of California, where Guisto played, is named Louis Guisto Field.

References

External links 

1895 births
1989 deaths
Cleveland Indians players
Major League Baseball first basemen
Baseball players from California
Saint Mary's Gaels baseball coaches
Saint Mary's Gaels baseball players
Minor league baseball managers
Portland Beavers players
Oakland Oaks (baseball) players